The English women's football champions are the winners of the highest national league in women's football in England. From 1991 this was the WFA National League/FA Women's Premier League, and since 2011 the FA Women's Super League.

First champions

Early 20th century

The codification of professional men's football by the Football Association in 1885 and the Football League in 1888 did not coincide with similar measures for the women's teams who were playing in those years. Clubs such as the British Ladies' Football Club (founded in 1895) mainly competed in friendly matches and national tours with some success.

Women's football had a resurgence in popularity and attendances around the country during and after the First World War. During the 1920–21 season, the Dick, Kerr Ladies F.C. toured Great Britain and won 58 matches out of 59 played, with one draw.

Stoke Ladies F.C. were the first known winners of a women's national knockout tournament in 1922, the English Ladies Football Association Challenge Cup, played under an effective ban on women's football by the FA. The renamed Dick, Kerr team, Preston Ladies, faced Edinburgh for a (British) cup named the Ladies' Football World Championship, on at least two occasions in the 1930s. Preston won in 1937 by a 5–1 score, but the trophy went to Scotland in 1939, when Edinburgh won the title, beating Preston 5–2 in an apparently longer club competition.

Women's Football Association (WFA)

The WFA was founded in November 1969 as the Ladies Football Association of Great Britain, when the main women's football competitions were Regional Leagues. After the English Football Association reversed its 1921 ban on women's games at its grounds, the WFA Cup began in 1970–71, a national competition initially including many clubs outside of England. In the 1971 Final, Southampton Women's F.C. became the champions by beating Kilmarnock's Stewarton Thistle, who won the first Scottish Women's Cup in the same year.

Southampton were the leading English team of the era, WFA Cup-winners eight times between 1971 and 1981, and runners-up twice. Doncaster Belles won their first WFA Cup Final in 1983 and proceeded to reach almost every Final in the next decade; the 1990 Final was their fourth Cup victory, but Millwall Lionesses beat Doncaster in the Final in 1991.

At this time, the WFA received a grant from the Sports Council to create the Women's National League. This began in the 1991–92 season with eight teams in the Premier Division, and 16 teams in the Northern and Southern Divisions. The WFA Cup (Women's FA Cup) has continued alongside the leagues, and the Women's National League Cup also started in 1991–92. Since then, the top-level league has determined the annual champions of English women's football – this encompasses the division's renaming as the FA Women's Premier League (from 1994), qualification to the UEFA Women's Cup (from 2001), and the addition of the FA WSL (from 2011).

List of League champions
Note: Bold designates teams that won a double with the Women's FA Cup.† Arsenal won a treble with the UEFA Women's Cup in 2007.

WFA National League Premier Division (1991–1994)

FA Women's Premier League National Division (1994–2010)

{| class="wikitable sortable"
|-
! Season
! style="width: 140px;" | Champions(number of titles)
! style="width: 140px;" | Runners-up
! style="width: 140px;" | Third place
! Top scorers
! Goals
|-
| 1994–95
| Arsenal (2)
| Liverpool
| Doncaster Belles
|-
| 1995–96
| Croydon
| Doncaster Belles
| Arsenal
|-
| 1996–97
| Arsenal (3)
| Doncaster Belles
| Croydon
|  Joanne Broadhurst (Arsenal)
| style="text-align:center" |21
|-
| 1997–98
| Everton
| Arsenal
| Doncaster Belles
|-
| 1998–99
| Croydon (2)
| Arsenal
|Doncaster Belles
|-
| 1999–2000
| Croydon (3)
| Doncaster Belles
| Arsenal
|-
| 2000–01
| Arsenal (4)
| Doncaster Belles
| Charlton Athletic
|-
| 2001–02
| Arsenal (5)
| Doncaster Belles
| Charlton Athletic
|-
| 2002–03
| Fulham| Doncaster Belles
| Arsenal
|-
| 2003–04
| Arsenal (6)
| Charlton Athletic
| Fulham

|-
| 2004–05
| Arsenal (7)
| Charlton Athletic
| Everton
|  Trudy Williams (Bristol Rovers)
| style="text-align:center" |20
|-
| 2005–06
| Arsenal (8)
| Everton
| Charlton Athletic
|  Kelly Smith (Arsenal)
| style="text-align:center" |18
|-
| 2006–07
| Arsenal (9)†
| Everton
| Charlton Athletic
|  Lianne Sanderson (Arsenal)
| style="text-align:center" |29
|-
| 2007–08
| Arsenal (10)
| Everton
| Leeds United
|  Lianne Sanderson (Arsenal)
| style="text-align:center" |25
|-
| 2008–09
| Arsenal' (11)
| Everton
| Chelsea
|  Kelly Smith (Arsenal)
| style="text-align:center" |25
|-
| 2009–10
| Arsenal (12)
| Everton
| Chelsea
|  Kim Little (Arsenal)
| style="text-align:center" |17
|-
|}

FA Women's Super League (2011–present)

Total titles won
Since 1991, eight separate clubs have won an English women's national league championship. Three more clubs have been the national runners-up.Note: Bold designates teams competing in 2022–23 FA WSL season.''

See also
 List of women's association football clubs in England
 List of Belgian women's football champions
 List of French women's football champions
 List of German women's football champions
 List of Swedish women's football champions
 List of association football competitions

Notes

References

England
Women's football champions
Lists of British award winners
Champions
Champions
 Champions
Women's association football-related lists
English women's football trophies and awards
Women's Super League awards
FA Women's National League awards